Jodeci is an American R&B quartet consisting of members DeVanté Swing, Mr. Dalvin, K-Ci, and JoJo.  Formed in 1989 in Charlotte, North Carolina, Jodeci's members began their musical careers as two duos of brothers and, after years of limited success, joined forces.  After signing with Uptown Records in 1991, the group began to work on their debut album, Forever My Lady, which brought them mainstream success with the Billboard Hot 100 single "Come and Talk to Me" and the album's titular track.

The group's critical and commercial success continued with the releases of Diary of a Mad Band (1993), and also with The Show, the After Party, the Hotel (1995), where the group experimented with various musical styles typically not associated with traditional R&B. Jodeci would incorporate hip hop soul, gospel and new jack swing into their music, which led to the group featured prominently with hip hop artists during the 1990s. Each album released by the group during this period attained platinum certification by the Recording Industry Association of America (RIAA), and helped to redefine the genre, allowing for developments in thematic and musical content within R&B.

In 1996, they announced a hiatus – though continuing to work on music as a group – which prompted K-Ci & JoJo to branch off as a duo, releasing five albums until 2013, when the group re-united for their fourth studio album, The Past, the Present, the Future (2015). Jodeci has sold more than 20 million records worldwide to date. Complex magazine ranks the group 1st on their "1990s Male R&B Group Pyramid of Excellence" list in 2014, one of the most influential groups of the 1990s, and the best R&B group of all time. Damon Hart was the last manager.

History

1983–1991: Early beginnings and formation 
Raised in extremely religious Pentecostal families, K-Ci and JoJo – then known as Little Cedric & the Hailey Singers – originally performed and recorded as a gospel group, releasing three albums; Jesus Saves, I'm Alright Now, and God's Blessings. K-Ci would later draw comparisons to Michael Jackson during his gospel career.  Separately, Mr. Dalvin and DeVanté Swing performed and toured in their own family's gospel group, where the duos later made acquaintances through relationships the members were in at the time. In a 2011 interview, Dalvin stated, "there was this girl gospel group called UNITY and then the Don DeGrate Delegation, which Devanté and I played in. So we met some of the girls from UNITY and [one] was dating K-Ci before we even met [and she] would always tell us that we need to meet K-Ci and JoJo." A short time after meeting, the brothers started living together after leaving their families to pursue musical careers.

At 16, DeVanté Swing traveled to Minneapolis, hoping to visit Paisley Park Studios in order to audition to Prince. Swing would later say, "I was up at Paisley Park every day begging for a job, asking people to listen to my tape. The receptionist kept saying she couldn't help me". The rejection motivated Swing to relocate back to North Carolina, and work to improve his songwriting and production skills. Upon arriving, Swing continued to record with the group's additional members, eventually forming Jodeci, and began work on a demo tape to present to label executives. The name Jodeci is an abbreviation of all the members names. "Jo" comes from JoJo, "De" comes from the last name of the DeGrate brothers, and Ci comes from K-Ci.

The members soon drove to New York City with a 29-song, 3 tape demo, anticipating a signing deal with upstart Uptown Records. Upon arriving to New York, and without the knowledge of the whereabouts of the MCA subsidiary, the group used a phone book to find the company's address, located on Clinton Street in Brooklyn. Swing later commented on the signing, "we didn't have an appointment but I knew what Uptown was, and I wanted us to be there." The group was quickly denied an audition until Andre Harrell agreed to hear the demo. In skepticism of the high quality production, Harrell requested the group to perform, where they performed "Come and Talk to Me" and "I'm Still Waiting", in the presence of Jeff Redd. Hip hop artist Heavy D overheard the performance and consulted Harrell, eventually taking the group out to dinner and awarding them a recording contract.

Jodeci was assigned to Uptown intern Sean Combs, who took on the task of developing the new act. Counteracting the refined styles prominent in R&B showcased by New Edition and Boyz II Men, Mr. Dalvin created the group's image. Combs helped get the image through to Andre Harrell, perpetuating hip-hop fashion, such as baseball caps and Timberland boots, to the group in order to establish a different aesthetic in the genre. The group was introduced after providing background vocals on the song "Treat Them Like They Want to Be Treated", and performed live on Soul Train on June 11, 1991.

1990–1995: Forever My Lady, Diary of a Mad Band, and The Show, the After Party, the Hotel 
Landing a recording deal in 1991, the group released their debut album Forever My Lady that same year. Writer Ronin Ro maintained, "They no longer resembled gospel singers… Puffy also asked them to build their mystique by posing for photos with their backs to the camera, which he borrowed from Guy's stage show." The album's seductive energy showcased DeVanté's songwriting, establishing a uniqueness in his production that mixed old-fashioned soul singing with New Jack Swing, creating a production of great boldness. It featured the number 1 R&B singles "Forever My Lady," "Stay," and "Come and Talk to Me." Mr. Dalvin recalls how the album Forever My Lady was created, "The last version of the album that was released only took us a week to finish because we had already written the songs. It was about getting our sounds right because the vocals were already done. It was us going back in the studio recreating the beats and the melodies... Most of the songs were written before we left North Carolina. My brother was 16 and I was 14 when we wrote the songs..." The album went on to sell over three million copies.

In 1993, a minor feud resulted over the band's second album, Diary of a Mad Band; Jodeci, unhappy with their treatment by Uptown, flirted with the idea of leaving for Death Row Records, which resulted in almost zero promotion for the album.  Reaching number 3 on the Billboard 200 and number-one on the R&B album chart, where it stayed for two weeks, spawning the #1 R&B hit "Cry for You"; "Feenin'" and "What About Us", Diary of a Mad Band eventually went double platinum.

Jodeci's third album, The Show, the After Party, the Hotel, was released in July 1995, reaching the second spot on the Billboard 200 making it the group's highest-peaking release and topping the U.S. R&B Albums chart. By September 1995, it was certified platinum in sales by the RIAA, after sales exceeding one million copies in the United States. The album contained the Top 40 hits "Freek'n You", "Love U 4 Life" and "Get on Up".

2014–present: Return and The Past, the Present, the Future 

In February 2014, Timbaland revealed that he was in the process of working with Jodeci on their comeback album.

On November 7, 2014, Jodeci reunited and performed a medley of their classic songs at the 2014 Soul Train Awards. The performance also included a snippet of a brand-new single titled "Nobody Wins," which was released on December 22, 2014. The song is the first single released by Jodeci in over 18 years. The last song released by the group was "Get on Up", in 1996. Prior to the performance, the group had not taken the stage together in the U.S. since 2006.

On January 28, 2015, a second single titled "Every Moment" was released. Also in that same month, it was announced by Epic Records that Jodeci had been signed to the label to release their new album. Timbaland, who recently brought his Mosley Music Group over to Epic, worked on the album. Their fourth album, The Past, the Present, the Future, was released on March 31, 2015. It was their first album in 20 years.

Shortly after the album's release, a Jodeci reunion tour was announced. The first show took place on June 6, 2015, in Richmond, Virginia, as a part of the city's 11th annual Stone Soul Music Festival.  Jodeci headlined the event, marking the group's first official concert performance together in the United States since 1995.

Legacy and influence 

Most of the elements that were eventually combined to form what became known as the "Jodeci style" originated with the work of new jack swing pioneers Keith Sweat and Teddy Riley, with an important influence being the work of Riley's three-man group Guy. Other influences include the works of Bobby Womack, Stevie Wonder, The Temptations, Bobby Brown,
and New Edition. The group's cover of Stevie Wonder's 1981 song "Lately", became their biggest pop hit to date, peaking at number four on the Billboard Hot 100 in August 1993.

Artists and producers heavily influenced by Jodeci were those were directly or indirectly associated with them, including Mary J. Blige, Dru Hill,  Usher and a number of the members of DeVanté's Swing Mob collective who he discovered and nurtured: Missy Elliott, Timbaland, Nealante, Magoo, Ginuwine, Stevie J, Playa (who R&B singer & songwriter Static Major was a part of) with Smoke E. Digglera, Suga (who R&B act Tweet was a part of), and Darryl Pearson.

To date, Jodeci remains well respected and revered among most hip-hop circles for their street-flavored sound and urban appeal.  The group has been mentioned and sampled in songs by a number of hip-hop artists including Notorious B.I.G., Twista, Jay-Z, Insane Clown Posse, Big K.R.I.T., David Banner, Bump J, Wale, Freddie Gibbs, Bun B, Tyga, CyHi the Prynce, Young Thug, Bryson Tiller and most notably Drake, who, along with J. Cole released a song titled "Jodeci Freestyle" in June 2013.  The song pays homage to the group and samples "4 U", an interlude from The Show, the After Party, the Hotel.  On October 19, 2014, a Drake song titled "How About Now" leaked to the internet.  The song samples Jodeci's "My Heart Belongs To U", and was later released in 2015 as a bonus track on the physical release of Drake's album/mixtape If You're Reading This It's Too Late.

Mariah Carey repeatedly mentions Jodeci in her song "The Impossible" from her album Memoirs of an Imperfect Angel, which sampled "Forever My Lady". She also samples Jodeci's "Freek'n You" in her song "Makin' It Last All Night" featuring Jermaine Dupri.  Additionally, she sampled a line from "Bring On Da' Funk" in her song "Don't Stop (Funkin' 4 Jamaica)" on her album Glitter.

Cardi B also mentions Jodeci in  Bruno Mars' and her song "Please Me".

Jodeci's "Freek'n You" is used as the ending theme in JoJo's Bizarre Adventure: Golden Wind.

Megan Thee Stallion sampled Jodeci's "Freek'n You Remix" for her song "Plan B".

Members 
Current
DeVante Swing – (1989–present) (producer, songwriter, background vocals; bass)
Mr. Dalvin – (1989–present) (producer, songwriter, background vocals; baritone)
K-Ci – (1989–present) (lead vocalist, songwriter, second tenor/baritone)
JoJo – (1989–present) (lead vocalist, songwriter, tenor)

Discography 

Studio albums
 Forever My Lady (1991)
 Diary of a Mad Band (1993)
 The Show, the After Party, the Hotel (1995)
 The Past, the Present, the Future (2015)

Awards and honors 

Billboard Music Award for Top R&B Album – Forever My Lady (1992)
Billboard Music Award for Top R&B Song – Come and Talk to Me (1992)
Billboard Music Award for Top R&B Artist (1992)
Soul Train Music Award for Best R&B/Soul Album, Group, Band or Duo – Forever My Lady (1992)
Soul Train Music Award for Best R&B/Soul Single – Lately (1994)
North Carolina Music Hall of Fame (2012)

See also 
K-Ci & JoJo
Swing Mob

References

External links 

African-American musical groups
American contemporary R&B musical groups
American soul musical groups
New jack swing music groups
MCA Records artists
Musical groups from North Carolina
Musical quartets
Swing Mob artists
1989 establishments in North Carolina